Ghost River may refer to:

Settlements
 In Canada
Ghost River, Cochrane District, Ontario
Ghost River, Kenora District, Ontario

Rivers
Ghost River (Alberta), in Canada.
a section of the Wolf River (Tennessee), in the United States

Music
"Ghost River", a song by Finnish symphonic metal band Nightwish from their 2011 album, Imaginaerum